The mayor of Pordenone is an elected politician who, along with the Pordenone's City Council, is accountable for the strategic government of Pordenone in Friuli-Venezia Giulia, Italy. The current Mayor is Alessandro Ciriani, a centre-right independent, who took office on 20 June 2016.

Overview
According to the Italian Constitution, the Mayor of Pordenone is member of the City Council.

The Mayor is elected by the population of Pordenone, who also elects the members of the City Council, controlling the Mayor's policy guidelines and is able to enforce his resignation by a motion of no confidence. The Mayor is entitled to appoint and release the members of his government.

Since 1994 the Mayor is elected directly by Pordenone's electorate: in all mayoral elections in Italy in cities with a population higher than 15,000 the voters express a direct choice for the mayor or an indirect choice voting for the party of the candidate's coalition. If no candidate receives at least 50% of votes, the top two candidates go to a second round after two weeks. The election of the City Council is based on a direct choice for the candidate with a preference vote: the candidate with the majority of the preferences is elected. The number of the seats for each party is determined proportionally.

Italian Republic (since 1946)

City Council election (1946–1993)
From 1948 to 1993, the Mayor of Pordenone was elected by the City's Council.

Direct election (since 1993)
Since 1993, under provisions of new local administration law, the Mayor of Pordenone is chosen by direct election.

Timeline

References

External links

Pordenone
 
Politics of Friuli-Venezia Giulia
Pordenone